is a passenger railway station located in the city of Yokkaichi,  Mie Prefecture, Japan, operated by the private railway operator Kintetsu Railway.

Lines
Shinshō Station is served by the Nagoya Line, and is located 38.1 rail kilometers from the starting point of the line at Kintetsu Nagoya Station.

Station layout
The station consists of two opposed side platforms.

Platforms

Adjacent stations

History
Shinshō Station opened on July 20, 1975.

Passenger statistics
In fiscal 2019, the station was used by an average of 783 passengers daily (boarding passengers only).

Surrounding area
Central Ryokuchi Park-A 
Yokkaichi Joint Government Building, Mie Prefecture

See also
List of railway stations in Japan

References

External links

 Kintetsu: Shinshō Station

Railway stations in Japan opened in 1975
Railway stations in Mie Prefecture
Stations of Kintetsu Railway
Yokkaichi